The Rural Municipality of Stanley No. 215 is a rural municipality (RM) in the Canadian province of Saskatchewan within Census Division No. 5 and  Division No. 1. It is located in the southeast portion of the province.

History 
The RM of Stanley No. 215 incorporated as a rural municipality on January 1, 1913.

Geography

Communities and localities 
The following urban municipalities are surrounded by the RM.

Cities
Melville

The following unincorporated communities are within the RM.

Organized hamlets
Westview

Demographics 

Government 
The RM of Stanley No. 215 is governed by an elected municipal council and an appointed administrator that meets on the second Tuesday of every month. The reeve of the RM is Max Halyk while its administrator is Dawn Oehler. The RM's office is located in Melville.

References 

Stanley
Stanley No. 215, Saskatchewan
Division No. 5, Saskatchewan